The 2001 Toronto Blue Jays was the franchise's 25th season of Major League Baseball. It resulted in the Blue Jays finishing third in the American League East with a record of 80 wins and 82 losses.

Offseason
 December 8, 2000: Dan Plesac was signed as a free agent by the Blue Jays.
 December 19, 2000: Izzy Molina was signed as a free agent by the Blue Jays.

Regular season
 August 17, 2001: Jeff Frye became the second Blue Jay in history to hit for the cycle. He achieved the feat against the Texas Rangers.

Opening Day starters
 Tony Batista
 José Cruz Jr.
 Carlos Delgado
 Darrin Fletcher
 Homer Bush
 Brad Fullmer
 Alex Gonzalez
 Esteban Loaiza
 Raúl Mondesí
 Shannon Stewart

Season standings

Record vs. opponents

Transactions
 June 5, 2001: Gabe Gross was drafted by the Blue Jays in the 1st round (15th pick) of the 2001 Major League Baseball draft. Player signed July 1, 2001.
June 8, 2001: Tony Fernández was signed as a free agent by the Blue Jays.
June 25, 2001: Tony Batista was selected off waivers by the Baltimore Orioles from the Toronto Blue Jays.

2001 Draft picks
Source 

The 2002 MLB draft was held in June 2001.

Roster

Game log

|- align="centre" bgcolor="bbffbb"
| 1 || April 1 || Rangers † || 8–1 || Loaiza (1–0) || Helling (0–1) || || 19,891 || 1–0
|- align="centre" bgcolor="ffbbbb"
| 2 || April 3 || @ Devil Rays || 8–1 || Lopez (1–0) || Parris (0–1) || || 41,546 || 1–1
|- align="centre" bgcolor="bbffbb"
| 3 || April 4 || @ Devil Rays || 11–8 || Quantrill (1–0) || Hill (0–1) || Koch (1) || 15,172 || 2–1
|- align="centre" bgcolor="bbffbb"
| 4 || April 5 || @ Devil Rays || 11–0 || Carpenter (1–0) || Rekar (0–1) || || 14,023 || 3–1
|- align="centre" bgcolor="bbffbb"
| 5 || April 6 || @ Yankees || 13–4 || Loaiza (2–0) || Parker (0–1) || || 29,606 || 4–1
|- align="centre" bgcolor="bbffbb"
| 6 || April 7 || @ Yankees || 3–2 || Michalak (1–0) || Hernández (0–1) || Koch (2) || 30,487 || 5–1
|- align="centre" bgcolor="ffbbbb"
| 7 || April 8 || @ Yankees || 16–5 || Clemens (2–0) || Parris (0–2) || || 31,970 || 5–2
|- align="centre" bgcolor="bbffbb"
| 8 || April 9 || Devil Rays || 8–1 || Hamilton (1–0) || Wilson (0–1) || || 48,115 || 6–2
|- align="centre" bgcolor="bbffbb"
| 9 || April 10 || Devil Rays || 3 – 2 (10) || Quantrill (2–0) || Sturtze (0–1)  || || 18,071 || 7–2
|- align="centre" bgcolor="ffbbbb"
| 10 || April 11 || Devil Rays || 4–3 || Yan (1–0) || Koch (0–1) || || 24,017 || 7–3
|- align="centre" bgcolor=#bbbbbb
| – || April 12 || Royals ||colspan=6|Postponed (SkyDome roof malfunction) Rescheduled for April 30
|- align="centre" bgcolor="bbffbb"
| 11 || April 13 || Royals || 2–1 || Michalak (2–0) || Suppan (1–2) || Koch (3) || 26,148 || 8–3
|- align="centre" bgcolor="bbffbb"
| 12 || April 14 || Royals || 5–4 || File (1–0) || Hernández (0–2) || || 26,024 || 9–3
|- align="centre" bgcolor="ffbbbb"
| 13 || April 15 || Royals || 4–2 || Stein (1–2) || Carpenter (1–1) || Hernández (2) || 21,379 || 9–4
|- align="centre" bgcolor="bbffbb"
| 14 || April 17 || Yankees || 6–5 || Loaiza (3–0) || Keisler (0–1) || Koch (4) || 20,019 || 10–4
|- align="centre" bgcolor="bbffbb"
| 15 || April 18 || Yankees || 7–2 || Michalak (3–0) || Hernández (0–2) || || 19,770 || 11–4
|- align="centre" bgcolor="ffbbbb"
| 16 || April 19 || Yankees || 6 – 5 (17) || Choate (1–0) || File (1–1) || Mendoza (1) || 24,684 || 11–5
|- align="centre" bgcolor="bbffbb"
| 17 || April 20 || @ Royals || 12–4 || Carpenter (2–1) || Suzuki (1–1) || || 28,018 || 12–5
|- align="centre" bgcolor="ffbbbb"
| 18 || April 21 || @ Royals || 5 – 4 (13) || Henry (1–0) || Plesac (0–1) || || 18,246 || 12–6
|- align="centre" bgcolor="ffbbbb"
| 19 || April 22 || @ Royals || 5–1 || Reichert (2–1) || Loaiza (3–1) || Hernández (4) || 17,371 || 12–7
|- align="centre" bgcolor="bbffbb"
| 20 || April 24 || Rangers || 7–5 || Frascatore (1–0) || Mahomes (0–2) || Koch (5) || 15,381 || 13–7
|- align="centre" bgcolor="bbffbb"
| 21 || April 25 || Rangers || 8–5 || Quantrill (3–0) || Rogers (1–2) || Koch (6) || 15,021 || 14–7
|- align="centre" bgcolor="bbffbb"
| 22 || April 27 || Angels || 12–4 || Loaiza (4–1) || Washburn (0–3) || || 16,174 || 15–7
|- align="centre" bgcolor="ffbbbb"
| 23 || April 28 || Angels || 4–1 || Ortiz (3–2) || Michalak (3–1) || Percival (4) || 19,261 || 15–8
|- align="centre" bgcolor="bbffbb"
| 24 || April 29 || Angels || 2–0 || Parris (1–2) || Schoeneweis (2–2) || Koch (7) || 23,949 || 16–8
|- align="centre" bgcolor="ffbbbb"
| 25 || April 30 || Royals || 6–3 || Suppan (2–3) || Hamilton (1–1) || Hernández (6) || 13,766 || 16–9
|-

|- align="centre" bgcolor="bbffbb"
| 26 || May 1 || @ Athletics || 5 – 4 (10) || Quantrill (4–0) || Isringhausen (0–1) || Koch (8) || 10,935 || 17–9
|- align="centre" bgcolor="ffbbbb"
| 27 || May 2 || @ Athletics || 6–0 || Mulder (3–2) || Loaiza (4–2) || || 14,048 || 17–10
|- align="centre" bgcolor="ffbbbb"
| 28 || May 3 || @ Athletics || 3 – 2 (15)|| Bradford (1–1) || Borbón (0–1) || || 10,586 || 17–11
|- align="centre" bgcolor="bbffbb"
| 29 || May 4 || @ Mariners || 8–3 || Parris (2–2) || Abbott (0–1) || || 42,284 || 18–11
|- align="centre" bgcolor="ffbbbb"
| 30 || May 5 || @ Mariners || 7–5 || Rhodes (3–0) || Borbón (0–2) || Sasaki (14) || 42,894 || 18–12
|- align="centre" bgcolor="bbffbb"
| 31 || May 6 || @ Mariners || 11–3 || Carpenter (3–1) || Halama (2–3) || || 45,080 || 19–12
|- align="centre" bgcolor="ffbbbb"
| 32 || May 8 || Athletics || 8–5 || Mulder (4–2) || Loaiza (4–3) || Mecir (1) || 16,479 || 19–13
|- align="centre" bgcolor="ffbbbb"
| 33 || May 9 || Athletics || 8–5 || Hudson (3–3) || Michalak (3–2) || Isringhausen (5) || 16,241 || 19–14
|- align="centre" bgcolor="ffbbbb"
| 34 || May 10 || Athletics || 14–8 || Guthrie (1–0) || Painter (0–1) || || 16,130 || 19–15
|- align="centre" bgcolor="ffbbbb"
| 35 || May 11 || Mariners || 7–2 || Abbott (1–1) || Hamilton (1–2) || || 20,279 || 19–16
|- align="centre" bgcolor="ffbbbb"
| 36 || May 12 || Mariners || 11–7 || Tomko (2–1) || Escobar (0–1) || || 24,908 || 19–17
|- align="centre" bgcolor="ffbbbb"
| 37 || May 13 || Mariners || 7–5 || Moyer (6–1) || Loaiza (4–4) || Sasaki (17) || 20,624 || 19–18
|- align="centre" bgcolor="bbffbb"
| 38 || May 15 || @ Angels || 9–3 || Michalak (4–2) || Valdez (2–3) || || 15,904 || 20–18
|- align="centre" bgcolor="ffbbbb"
| 39 || May 16 || @ Angels || 3–1 || Schoeneweis (3–2) || Parris (2–3) || Percival (8) || 15,611 || 20–19
|- align="centre" bgcolor="ffbbbb"
| 40 || May 17 || @ Angels || 4–2 || Hasegawa (2–3) || Escobar (0–2) || Percival (9) || 15,204 || 20–20
|- align="centre" bgcolor="bbffbb"
| 41 || May 18 || @ Rangers || 9–3 || Carpenter (4–1) || Myette (0–1) || || 35,368 || 21–20
|- align="centre" bgcolor="bbffbb"
| 42 || May 19 || @ Rangers || 6–5 || Quantrill (5–0) || Brantley (0–1) || Koch (9) || 48,336 || 22–20
|- align="centre" bgcolor="ffbbbb"
| 43 || May 20 || @ Rangers || 3–2 || Mahomes (3–2) || Michalak (4–3) || Zimmerman (4) || 33,272 || 22–21
|- align="centre" bgcolor="bbffbb"
| 44 || May 21 || White Sox || 10–3 || Parris (3–3) || Biddle (1–4) || || 20,806 || 23–21
|- align="centre" bgcolor="bbffbb"
| 45 || May 23 || White Sox || 9–6 || Hamilton (2–2) || Wells (3–5) || Koch (10) || 19,115 || 24–21
|- align="centre" bgcolor="ffbbbb"
| 46 || May 24 || White Sox || 3–1 || Wells (1–1) || Carpenter (4–2) || Foulke (8) || 17,062 || 24–22
|- align="centre" bgcolor="ffbbbb"
| 47 || May 25 || @ Red Sox || 4–0 || Nomo (5–3) || Loaiza (4–5) || || 32,912 || 24–23
|- align="centre" bgcolor="bbffbb"
| 48 || May 26 || @ Red Sox || 5–0 || Michalak (5–3) || Castillo (5–3) || || 31,035 || 25–23
|- align="centre" bgcolor="ffbbbb"
| 49 || May 27 || @ Red Sox || 4–2 || Wakefield (2–0) || Parris (3–4) || Lowe (4) || 31,420 || 25–24
|- align="centre" bgcolor="ffbbbb"
| 50 || May 28 || @ White Sox || 6–3 || Garland (2–2) || Hamilton (2–3) || Howry (1) || 20,631 || 25–25
|- align="centre" bgcolor="bbffbb"
| 51 || May 29 || @ White Sox || 4–0 || Carpenter (5–2) || Wells (1–2) || || 13,356 || 26–25
|- align="centre" bgcolor="ffbbbb"
| 52 || May 30 || @ White Sox || 4–3 || Wunsch (1–1) || Escobar (0–3) || Foulke (9) || 13,208 || 26–26
|- align="centre" bgcolor="ffbbbb"
| 53 || May 31 || Red Sox || 11–5 || Beck (1–2) || Escobar (0–4) || || 21,747 || 26–27
|-

|- align="centre" bgcolor="ffbbbb"
| 54 || June 1 || Red Sox || 6 – 4 (11)|| Lowe (3–5) || Koch (0–2) || || 21,564 || 26–28
|- align="centre" bgcolor="ffbbbb"
| 55 || June 2 || Red Sox || 2–1 || Schourek (1–3) || Plesac (0–2) || Beck (3) || 24,603 || 26–29
|- align="centre" bgcolor="ffbbbb"
| 56 || June 3 || Red Sox || 5–4 || Pichardo (1–0) || Carpenter (5–3) || Lowe (6) || 24,653 || 26–30
|- align="centre" bgcolor="bbffbb"
| 57 || June 5 || Devil Rays || 13–1 || Loaiza (5–5) || Lopez (3–7) || || 15,078 || 27–30
|- align="centre" bgcolor="ffbbbb"
| 58 || June 6 || Devil Rays || 6–2 || Kennedy (1–0) || Michalak (5–4) || || 16,298 || 27–31
|- align="centre" bgcolor="bbffbb"
| 59 || June 7 || Devil Rays || 8–7 || Borbón (1–2) || Phelps (0–1) || || 26,835 || 28–31
|- align="centre" bgcolor="bbffbb"
| 60 || June 8 || Marlins || 7 – 6 (10)|| Koch (1–2) || Bones (2–2) || || 18,629 || 29–31
|- align="centre" bgcolor="ffbbbb"
| 61 || June 9 || Marlins || 6–1 || Burnett (4–2) || Carpenter (5–4) || || 20,875 || 29–32
|- align="centre" bgcolor="ffbbbb"
| 62 || June 10 || Marlins || 7–2 || Penny (5–1) || Loaiza (5–6) || || 20,070 || 29–33
|- align="centre" bgcolor="bbffbb"
| 63 || June 11 || Braves || 9–4 || File (2–1) || Burkett (5–5) || || 16,885 || 30–33
|- align="centre" bgcolor="ffbbbb"
| 64 || June 12 || Braves || 3–0 || Pérez (4–4) || Parris (3–5) || Rocker (19) || 20,448 || 30–34
|- align="centre" bgcolor="bbffbb"
| 65 || June 13 || Braves || 12–5 || Hamilton (3–3) || Glavine (6–5) || || 19,901 || 31–34
|- align="centre" bgcolor="bbffbb"
| 66 || June 15 || @ Expos || 9–3 || Carpenter (6–4) || Vázquez (5–8) || || 8,692 || 32–34
|- align="centre" bgcolor="ffbbbb"
| 67 || June 16 || @ Expos || 7–2 || Blank (1–2) || Loaiza (5–7) || || 11,113 || 32–35
|- align="centre" bgcolor="ffbbbb"
| 68 || June 17 || @ Expos || 4–1 || Mota (1–0) || Quantrill (5–1) || || 8,440 || 32–36
|- align="centre" bgcolor="ffbbbb"
| 69 || June 18 || @ Orioles || 3–2 || Ponson (4–4) || Borbón (1–3) || Trombley (5) || 33,605 || 32–37
|- align="centre" bgcolor="ffbbbb"
| 70 || June 19 || @ Orioles || 5–1 || Towers (5–1) || Hamilton (3–4) || Groom (4) || 31,001 || 32–38
|- align="centre" bgcolor="bbffbb"
| 71 || June 20 || @ Orioles || 6–5 || Quantrill (6–1) || McElroy (1–2) || Koch (11) || 30,062 || 33–38
|- align="centre" bgcolor="bbffbb"
| 72 || June 22 || @ Red Sox || 4–3 || Borbón (2–3) || Schourek (1–4) || Koch (12) || 33,844 || 34–38
|- align="centre" bgcolor="bbffbb"
| 73 || June 23 || @ Red Sox || 9–6 || File (3–1) || Castillo (7–5) || Koch (13) || 33,266 || 35–38
|- align="centre" bgcolor="bbffbb"
| 74 || June 24 || @ Red Sox || 5–2 || Plesac (1–2) || Wakefield (5–2) || Koch (14) || 32,804 || 36–38
|- align="centre" bgcolor="ffbbbb"
| 75 || June 25 || Orioles || 8–2 || Roberts (6–6) || Hamilton (3–5) || || 18,243 || 36–39
|- align="centre" bgcolor="bbffbb"
| 76 || June 26 || Orioles || 3–1 || Carpenter (7–4) || Johnson (6–5) || Koch (15) || 18,175 || 37–39
|- align="centre" bgcolor="ffbbbb"
| 77 || June 27 || Orioles || 7–3 || Mercedes (4–8) || Loaiza (5–8) || || 17,517 || 37–40
|- align="centre" bgcolor="ffbbbb"
| 78 || June 28 || Orioles || 5–0 || Ponson (5–5) || Michalak (5–5) || || 17,322 || 37–41
|- align="centre" bgcolor="bbffbb"
| 79 || June 29 || Red Sox || 8–4 || Quantrill (7–1) || Florie (0–1) || || 23,055 || 38–41
|- align="centre" bgcolor="ffbbbb"
| 80 || June 30 || Red Sox || 7–5 || Cone (4–1) || Hamilton (3–6) || || 28,543 || 38–42
|-

|- align="centre" bgcolor="ffbbbb"
| 81 || July 1 || Red Sox || 4–0 || Arrojo (2–2) || Carpenter (7–5) || || 34,348 || 38–43
|- align="centre" bgcolor="ffbbbb"
| 82 || July 2 || Red Sox || 16–4 || Nomo (7–4) || Loaiza (5–9) || || 38,237 || 38–44
|- align="centre" bgcolor="ffbbbb"
| 83 || July 3 || @ Devil Rays || 7–2 || Kennedy (3–1) || Michalak (5–6) || Phelps (3) || 13,789 || 38–45
|- align="centre" bgcolor="bbffbb"
| 84 || July 4 || @ Devil Rays || 8–1 || Parris (4–5) || Rekar (1–10) || || 13,119 || 39–45
|- align="centre" bgcolor="bbffbb"
| 85 || July 5 || @ Devil Rays || 7–4 || Hamilton (4–6) || Rupe (4–8) || Koch (16) || 10,706 || 40–45
|- align="centre" bgcolor="ffbbbb"
| 86 || July 6 || Expos || 10–7 || Lloyd (7–1) || Quantrill (7–2) || Urbina (13) || 20,074 || 40–46
|- align="centre" bgcolor="bbffbb"
| 87 || July 7 || Expos || 9 – 8 (11)|| Plesac (2–2) || Strickland (1–4) || || 23,976 || 41–46
|- align="centre" bgcolor="bbffbb"
| 88 || July 8 || Expos || 9–3 || Michalak (6–6) || Armas (7–8) || Quantrill (1) || 31,012 || 42–46
|- align="centre" bgcolor="bbffbb"
| 89 || July 12 || @ Phillies || 2 – 1 (11)|| Escobar (1–4) || Santiago (0–2) || Koch (17) || 20,306 || 43–46
|- align="centre" bgcolor="ffbbbb"
| 90 || July 13 || @ Phillies || 5–2 || Daal (10–2) || Plesac (2–3) || Mesa (25) || 18,279 || 43–47
|- align="centre" bgcolor="bbffbb"
| 91 || July 14 || @ Phillies || 4–2 || Hamilton (5–6) || Figueroa (1–2) || Koch (18) || 22,418 || 44–47
|- align="centre" bgcolor="ffbbbb"
| 92 || July 15 || @ Mets || 6–2 || Reed (8–4) || Michalak (6–7) || || 32,138 || 44–48
|- align="centre" bgcolor="ffbbbb"
| 93 || July 16 || @ Mets || 3–0 || Trachsel (3–10) || Halladay (0–1) || Benítez (21) || 34,203 || 44–49
|- align="centre" bgcolor="ffbbbb"
| 94 || July 17 || @ Mets || 1–0 || Leiter (6–8) || Carpenter (7–6) || Benítez (22) || 26,630 || 44–50
|- align="centre" bgcolor="ffbbbb"
| 95 || July 18 || Red Sox || 5–4 || Garcés (3–0) || Koch (1–3) || Lowe (19) || 30,449 || 44–51
|- align="centre" bgcolor="bbffbb"
| 96 || July 19 || Red Sox || 4–3 || Escobar (2–4) || Lowe (4–7) || || 30,488 || 45–51
|- align="centre" bgcolor="bbffbb"
| 97 || July 20 || @ Yankees || 10–4 || Loaiza (6–9) || Jodie (0–1) || || 46,634 || 46–51
|- align="centre" bgcolor="bbffbb"
| 98 || July 21 || @ Yankees || 5–3 || Quantrill (8–2) || Rivera (3–5) || Koch (19) || 55,264 || 47–51
|- align="centre" bgcolor="ffbbbb"
| 99 || July 22 || @ Yankees || 7–3 || Mussina (10–8) || Carpenter (7–7) || || 51,132 || 47–52
|- align="centre" bgcolor="ffbbbb"
| 100 || July 23 || @ Yankees || 7–2 || Clemens (14–1) || Parris (4–6) || || 38,573 || 47–53
|- align="centre" bgcolor="ffbbbb"
| 101 || July 24 || @ Red Sox || 6–4 || Cone (6–1) || Hamilton (5–7) || Lowe (20) || 33,154 || 47–54
|- align="centre" bgcolor="bbffbb"
| 102 || July 25 || @ Red Sox || 4 – 3 (10)|| Quantrill (9–2) || Lowe (4–8) || Koch (20) || 33,030 || 48–54
|- align="centre" bgcolor="ffbbbb"
| 103 || July 26 || @ Red Sox || 6–3 || Nomo (11–4) || File (3–2) || Beck (5) || 33,094 || 48–55
|- align="centre" bgcolor="ffbbbb"
| 104 || July 27 || Yankees || 9–1 || Mussina (11–8) || Carpenter (7–8) || || 36,666 || 48–56
|- align="centre" bgcolor="ffbbbb"
| 105 || July 28 || Yankees || 12–1 || Clemens (15–1) || Escobar (2–5) || || 44,105 || 48–57
|- align="centre" bgcolor="ffbbbb"
| 106 || July 29 || Yankees || 9–3 || Pettitte (11–6) || Hamilton (5–8) || || 40,149 || 48–58
|- align="centre" bgcolor="bbffbb"
| 107 || July 31 || Twins || 3–1 || Loaiza (7–9) || Mays (12–8) || Koch (21) || 23,849 || 49–58
|-

|- align="centre" bgcolor="bbffbb"
| 108 || August 1 || Twins || 3–1 || Halladay (1–1) || Lohse (3–4) || Koch (22) || 26,069 || 50–58
|- align="centre" bgcolor="ffbbbb"
| 109 || August 2 || Twins || 9–4 || Reed (9–6) || Carpenter (7–9) || || 26,849 || 50–59
|- align="centre" bgcolor="bbffbb"
| 110 || August 3 || Orioles || 10–1 || Escobar (3–5) || Mercedes (5–13) || || 20,115 || 51–59
|- align="centre" bgcolor="bbffbb"
| 111 || August 4 || Orioles || 2–1 || Lyon (1–0) || Ponson (5–7) || Koch (23) || 22,322 || 52–59
|- align="centre" bgcolor="bbffbb"
| 112 || August 5 || Orioles || 5–4 || Loaiza (8–9) || Towers (6–7) || Koch (24) || 27,724 || 53–59
|- align="centre" bgcolor="ffbbbb"
| 113 || August 7 || @ Mariners || 5 – 4 (14)|| Halama (8–6) || DeWitt (0–1) || || 45,636 || 53–60
|- align="centre" bgcolor="ffbbbb"
| 114 || August 8 || @ Mariners || 12–4 || Moyer (13–5) || Carpenter (7–10) || || 45,450 || 53–61
|- align="centre" bgcolor="bbffbb"
| 115 || August 9 || @ Mariners || 6–5 || Quantrill (10–2) || García (13–4) || Koch (25) || 45,670 || 54–61
|- align="centre" bgcolor="ffbbbb"
| 116 || August 10 || @ Angels || 8–7 || Schoeneweis (9–8) || Lyon (1–1) || Percival (32) || 30,484 || 54–62
|- align="centre" bgcolor="bbffbb"
| 117 || August 11 || @ Angels || 7 – 6 (10)|| Plesac (3–3) || Levine (5–7) || Koch (26) || 27,927 || 55–62
|- align="centre" bgcolor="ffbbbb"
| 118 || August 12 || @ Angels || 6–5 || Levine (6–7) || Plesac (3–4) || Percival (33) || 19,129 || 55–63
|- align="centre" bgcolor="bbffbb"
| 119 || August 14 || Athletics || 6–3 || Koch (2–3) || Isringhausen (4–3) || || 25,121 || 56–63
|- align="centre" bgcolor="bbffbb"
| 120 || August 15 || Athletics || 5–2 || Escobar (4–5) || Zito (8–8) || Koch (27) || 23,135 || 57–63
|- align="centre" bgcolor="ffbbbb"
| 121 || August 16 || Athletics || 8–4 || Lidle (8–5) || Lyon (1–2) || || 30,062 || 57–64
|- align="centre" bgcolor="bbffbb"
| 122 || August 17 || Rangers || 11–3 || Loaiza (9–9) || Oliver (9–8) || || 22,384 || 58–64
|- align="centre" bgcolor="ffbbbb"
| 123 || August 18 || Rangers || 12–5 || Moreno (3–2) || Koch (2–4) || || 26,092 || 58–65
|- align="centre" bgcolor="ffbbbb"
| 124 || August 19 || Rangers || 8–4 || Myette (2–2) || Carpenter (7–11) || || 30,336 || 58–66
|- align="centre" bgcolor="bbffbb"
| 125 || August 20 || @ Twins || 3–2 || Escobar (5–5) || Mays (12–12) || Koch (28) || 16,032 || 59–66
|- align="centre" bgcolor="bbffbb"
| 126 || August 21 || @ Twins || 7–5 || Lyon (2–2) || Cressend (2–2) || Koch (29) || 13,023 || 60–66
|- align="centre" bgcolor="ffbbbb"
| 127 || August 22 || @ Twins || 6–3 || Reed (2–2) || Loaiza (9–10) || || 15,303 || 60–67
|- align="centre" bgcolor="bbffbb"
| 128 || August 23 || @ Twins || 6–2 || Halladay (2–1) || Lohse (4–6) || || 16,482 || 61–67
|- align="centre" bgcolor="bbffbb"
| 129 || August 24 || @ Orioles || 5–0 || Carpenter (8–11) || Johnson (10–9) || || 43,606 || 62–67
|- align="centre" bgcolor="bbffbb"
| 130 || August 25 || @ Orioles || 9–0 || Escobar (6–5) || Maduro (2–4) || || 42,260 || 63–67
|- align="centre" bgcolor="bbffbb"
| 131 || August 26 || @ Orioles || 5–1 || Lyon (3–2) || Mercedes (7–15) || || 37,994 || 64–67
|- align="centre" bgcolor="ffbbbb"
| 132 || August 28 || @ Yankees || 4–0 || Mussina (13–11) || Loaiza (9–11) || Rivera (41) || 37,450 || 64–68
|- align="centre" bgcolor="bbffbb"
| 133 || August 29 || @ Yankees || 3–2 || Halladay (3–1) || Hitchcock (3–3) || Koch (30) || 36,855 || 65–68
|- align="centre" bgcolor="ffbbbb"
| 134 || August 30 || @ Yankees || 5 – 4 (11)|| Witasick (3–0) || Eyre (0–1) || || 42,537 || 65–69
|- align="centre" bgcolor="ffbbbb"
| 135 || August 31 || Tigers || 4–3 || Sparks (10–8) || Borbón (2–4) || Anderson (17) || 22,383 || 65–70
|-

|- align="centre" bgcolor="bbffbb"
| 136 || September 1 || Tigers || 3–1 || Lyon (4–2) || Weaver (10–14) || Plesac (1) || 22,052 || 66–70
|- align="centre" bgcolor="bbffbb"
| 137 || September 2 || Tigers || 11–0 || Loaiza (10–11) || Lima (4–6) || || 24,146 || 67–70
|- align="centre" bgcolor="ffbbbb"
| 138 || September 3 || Yankees || 7–5 || Wohlers (1–0) || Koch (2–5) || Mendoza (6) || 28,404 || 67–71
|- align="centre" bgcolor="bbffbb"
| 139 || September 4 || Yankees || 14–0 || Carpenter (9–11) || Pettitte (14–9) || || 20,036 || 68–71
|- align="centre" bgcolor="ffbbbb"
| 140 || September 5 || Yankees || 4–3 || Clemens (19–1) || Escobar (6–6) || Rivera (44) || 29,235 || 68–72
|- align="centre" bgcolor="bbffbb"
| 141 || September 7 || @ Tigers || 2–1 || Lyon (5–2) || Lima (4–7) || Koch (31) || 28,083 || 69–72
|- align="centre" bgcolor="ffbbbb"
| 142 || September 8 || @ Tigers || 4–3 || Murray (1–4) || Halladay (3–2) || Anderson (18) || 29,158 || 69–73
|- align="centre" bgcolor="bbffbb"
| 143 || September 9 || @ Tigers || 6–3 || Carpenter (10–11) || Cornejo (3–3) || || 24,652 || 70–73
|- align="centre" bgcolor=#bbbbbb
| – || September 11 || @ Orioles ||colspan=6|Postponed (September 11 attacks) Rescheduled for October 1
|- align="centre" bgcolor=#bbbbbb
| – || September 12 || @ Orioles ||colspan=6|Postponed (September 11 attacks) Rescheduled for October 2
|- align="centre" bgcolor=#bbbbbb
| – || September 13 || @ Orioles ||colspan=6|Postponed (September 11 attacks) Rescheduled for October 3
|- align="centre" bgcolor=#bbbbbb
| – || September 14 || Indians ||colspan=6|Postponed (September 11 attacks) Rescheduled for October 5
|- align="centre" bgcolor=#bbbbbb
| – || September 15 || Indians ||colspan=6|Postponed (September 11 attacks) Rescheduled for October 6
|- align="centre" bgcolor=#bbbbbb
| – || September 16 || Indians ||colspan=6|Postponed (September 11 attacks) Rescheduled for October 7
|- align="centre" bgcolor="bbffbb"
| 144 || September 18 || Orioles || 8–5 || Plesac (4–4) || Julio (1–1) || Koch (32) || 18,604 || 71–73
|- align="centre" bgcolor="bbffbb"
| 145 || September 19 || Orioles || 4–1 || Halladay (4–2) || Maduro (3–6) || Koch (33) || 31,303 || 72–73
|- align="centre" bgcolor="ffbbbb"
| 146 || September 20 || Orioles || 12–6 || Parrish (1–1) || File (3–3) || || 21,895 || 72–74
|- align="centre" bgcolor="ffbbbb"
| 147 || September 21 || Devil Rays || 7–4 || Rekar (2–13) || Lyon (5–3) || Yan (18) || 25,344 || 72–75
|- align="centre" bgcolor="bbffbb"
| 148 || September 22 || Devil Rays || 8–7 || Coco (1–0) || Colomé (1–2) || Koch (34) || 24,691 || 73–75
|- align="centre" bgcolor="ffbbbb"
| 149 || September 23 || Devil Rays || 1–0 || Kennedy (6–8) || Escobar (6–7) || Yan (19) || 31,351 || 73–76
|- align="centre" bgcolor="bbffbb"
| 150 || September 24 || @ Indians || 3 – 2 (11)|| File (4–3) || Báez (5–2) || Eyre (1) || 32,425 || 74–76
|- align="centre" bgcolor="ffbbbb"
| 151 || September 25 || @ Indians || 11–7 || Riske (2–0) || Plesac (4–5) || || 35,729 || 74–77
|- align="centre" bgcolor=#bbbbbb
| – || September 26 || @ Indians ||colspan=6|Postponed (rain) Rescheduled for October 5 ‡
|- align="centre" bgcolor="ffbbbb"
| 152 || September 27 || @ Devil Rays || 5–1 || Colomé (2–2) || Eyre (0–2) || || 13,045 || 74–78
|- align="centre" bgcolor="ffbbbb"
| 153 || September 28 || @ Devil Rays || 6–1 || Rekar (3–13) || Escobar (6–8) || Phelps (5) || 10,586 || 74–79
|- align="centre" bgcolor="ffbbbb"
| 154 || September 29 || @ Devil Rays || 5–2 || Bierbrodt (2–4) || Halladay (4–3) || Yan (20) || 17,635 || 74–80
|- align="centre" bgcolor="bbffbb"
| 155 || September 30 || @ Devil Rays || 6 – 5 (12)|| Quantrill (11–2) || Creek (2–5) || Eyre (2) || 14,217 || 75–80
|-

|- align="centre" bgcolor="bbffbb"
| 156 || October 1 || @ Orioles || 1–0 || Loaiza (11–11) || Bauer (0–4) || Koch (35) || 37,108 || 76–80
|- align="centre" bgcolor="ffbbbb"
| 157 || October 2 || @ Orioles || 4–3 || Roberts (9–9) || DeWitt (0–2) || || 29,390 || 76–81
|- align="centre" bgcolor="bbffbb"
| 158 || October 3 || @ Orioles || 7–6 || Eyre (1–2) || Groom (1–4) || Koch (36) || 33,705 || 77–81
|- align="centre" bgcolor="bbffbb"
| 159 || October 5 || Indians || 5–0 || Halladay (5–3) || Finley (8–7) || || || 78–81
|- align="centre" bgcolor="bbffbb"
| 160 || October 5 || Indians || 4 – 3 (11)|| File (5–3) || Drese (1–2) || || 19,387 || 79–81
|- align="centre" bgcolor="bbffbb"
| 161 || October 6 || Indians || 5–2 || Carpenter (11–11) || Drew (0–2) || Quantrill (2) || 20,762 || 80–81
|- align="centre" bgcolor="ffbbbb"
| 162 || October 7 || Indians || 3–2 || Sabathia (17–5) || Lyon (5–4) || Rocker (4) || 28,217 || 80–82
|-

| † At Hiram Bithorn Stadium in San Juan, Puerto Rico. ‡ Due to scheduling difficulties, this game was made up in Toronto.

Player stats

Batting

Starters by position
Note: Pos = Position; G = Games played; AB = At bats; H = Hits; Avg. = Batting average; HR = Home runs; RBI = Runs batted in

Other batters
Note: G = Games played; AB = At bats; H = Hits; Avg. = Batting average; HR = Home runs; RBI = Runs batted in

Pitching

Starting pitchers
Note: G = Games pitched; IP = Innings pitched; W = Wins; L = Losses; ERA = Earned run average; SO = Strikeouts

Other pitchers
Note: G = Games pitched; IP = Innings pitched; W = Wins; L = Losses; ERA = Earned run average; SO = Strikeouts

Relief pitchers
Note: G = Games pitched; W = Wins; L = Losses; SV = Saves; ERA = Earned run average; SO = Strikeouts

Award winners
All-Star Game
 Paul Quantrill, P

Farm system

References

External links
2001 Toronto Blue Jays at Baseball Reference
2001 Toronto Blue Jays at Baseball Almanac

Toronto Blue Jays seasons
2001 in Canadian sports
Toronto Blue Jays
2001 in Toronto